Rusinowo  is a village in the administrative district of Gmina Rypin, within Rypin County, Kuyavian-Pomeranian Voivodeship, in north-central Poland.

History

During the German occupation of Poland (World War II), Rusinowo was the site of a massacre of around 200 Poles from the nearby town of Rypin and the Rypin County, carried out by Germany as part of the genocidal Intelligenzaktion. In 1942, the occupiers also carried out expulsions of Poles, whose farms were then handed over to Germans as part of the Lebensraum policy.

References

Rusinowo
Nazi war crimes in Poland